The Connecticut Death Index is maintained by the Connecticut Department of Public Health and list all people who died in Connecticut starting in 1949. In 2011 the state switched to an online system for recording deaths to replace the hand written death certificates.

References

External links
 Connecticut Death Index, 1949–2001 at Ancestry.com
 Connecticut, Death Index, 1949–2001 at FamilySearch.org
 Connecticut Deaths, 1949–2010 at FindMyPast.com
 Connecticut Death Record Index, 1949–2001 at mocavo.com

Death indexes
Death in Connecticut